Vladimir Shklyarov (born 9 February 1985) is a principal dancer of Mariinsky Ballet and a guest principal with the Bayerische Staatsballett and The Royal Ballet.

Biography
Vladimir Shklyarov was born in Leningrad, which is now Saint Petersburg. He studied at the Vaganova Academy of Russian Ballet and graduated in 2003, class of Vitaly Afanaskov, and joined the Mariinsky Ballet the same year. He was promoted to principal in 2011.

His repertoire includes James in La Sylphide, Duke Albrecht in Giselle, Solor in La Bayadère, Prince Désiré in The Sleeping Beauty, Prince Siegfried in Swan Lake, the Prince in The Nutcracker, Jean de Brienne in Raymonda, Basilio in Don Quixote and Ivan the Fool in The Little Humpbacked Horse. He has also danced the lead roles in the Paquita Grand Pas Classique, Le Spectre de la Rose, Chopiniana and Jewels.

In 2007, he danced the lead role of Zéphyr in the première of Sergei Vikharev's reconstruction of Marius Petipa's one act ballet, The Awakening of Flora. He also danced the lead role of Harlequin in the première of Vikharev's reconstruction of Michel Fokine's ballet, La Carnaval.

In September 2016, Shklyarov and his wife took a one-year sabbatical from the Mariinsky and joined the Bayerisches Staatsballett in Munich, Germany as principals with the invitation of Igor Zelensky, the theater's new artistic director. They returned to Saint Petersburg in 2017, but continue to dance as guests in Munich.

In 2017, Shklyarov joined the Royal Ballet in London as a guest principal after he filled in for Sergei Polunin, who withdrew at the last minute, in Frederick Ashton's Marguerite and Armand.

Personal life

Shklyarov is married to fellow Russian ballerina, Maria Shirinkina. In February 2015, two days before his 30th birthday, he became a father for the first time when his wife gave birth to their son, Alexey. In July 2021, the couple's second child, daughter Alexandra was born.

Repertoire
Count Albrecht in Giselle
James in La Sylphide
Prince Désiré in The Sleeping Beauty
Prince Siegfried in Swan Lake
The Prince in Vainonen's The Nutcracker
Zephyr in The Awakening of Flora
Solor in La Bayadère
Jean de Brienne in Raymonda
Basilio in Don Quixote
Ali in Le Corsaire
Petrushka in Petrushka
The Ghost of the Rose in Le Spectre de la rose
Matteo in Pierre Lacotte's Ondine
Romeo in Lavrovsky's and Cranko's Romeo and Juliet
Ali-Batyr in Leonid Yakobson's Shurale
Ivanushka in Alexei Ratmansky's The Little Humpbacked Horse
The Prince in Alexei Ratmansky's Cinderella
Spartacus in Yuri Grigorovich's Spartacus
Ferkhad in Yuri Grigorovich's The Legend of Love
The Hooligan in The Young Lady and the Hooligan
Colas in Frederick Ashton's La fille mal gardée
Aminta in Frederick Ashton's Sylvia
Armand in Frederick Ashton's Marguerite and Armand
Jack/Knave of Hearts in Christopher Wheeldon's Alice's Adventures in Wonderland
Rubies and Diamonds in Jewels
Third Movement in Symphony in C
Tschaikovsky Pas de Deux
Des Grieux in Kenneth MacMillan's Manon

Awards
Prize-winner at the XI International Ballet and Choreography Competition, in the category "Solo" (Moscow, 2009, 1st prize) 
Prize-winner at the Vaganova-Prix International Competition (St. Petersburg, 2002) 
Holder of the Soul of Dance – 2008 prize, instituted by Ballet magazine, in the category "Rising Star”
Holder of the annual Leonid Massine International Prize For the Art of Dance (Positano, Italy, 2008)
Holder of the Zegna – Mariinsky New Talent Awards grant (London, 2008)
Holder of the DANCE OPEN international ballet prize in the category "Mr Virtuoso" (2014)
Holder of the BALLET2000 Prize, instituted by BALLET2000 magazine (2016)

References

External links

1985 births
Living people
Vaganova graduates
Russian male ballet dancers
Mariinsky Ballet principal dancers
21st-century Russian ballet dancers